The Shannon-Williamson Ranch, is located in Antioch, California. The Williamson family settled in Antioch in 1867. They were granted a homestead in 1874 signed by then U.S. President Ulysses S. Grant. The original house burned down in 1895. The current house that stands is the one that was rebuilt after the fire. The ranch operated from 1875 to 1949. The ranch was saved in 1987 by the efforts of one of the inhabitants of the house Donald Williamson. The once  ranch raised crops such as wheat, barley, hay, and livestock. The ranch is currently closed to the public and there are currently no plans for the future of the house and property. The surrounding area has been named after the ranch such as the housing subdivision and the shopping mall directly across the street from it. The ranch property has a fence that surrounds the entire property.

See also
 National Register of Historic Places listings in Contra Costa County, California

References

External links
 Obituary of Donald Williamson

History of Contra Costa County, California
Historic districts on the National Register of Historic Places in California
National Register of Historic Places in the San Francisco Bay Area
Antioch, California
Ranches on the National Register of Historic Places in California